Tatiana Rynearson is an American oceanographer who is a professor at the University of Rhode Island. Her research considers plankton diversity and abundance. Rynearson has been on several research cruises, including trips to the North Sea, Puget Sound, the Gulf of Mexico and the North Atlantic.

Early life and education 
Rynearson grew up in Ohio. She became interested in aquatic science as a junior at high school. She was an undergraduate student at Brown University, where she studied aquatic sciences. She was a graduate student at the University of Washington, where she studied the bloom dynamics in the centric diatom Ditylum brightwellii. She remained at Washington as a postdoctoral researcher until she was appointed to the faculty at the University of Rhode Island in 2005.

Research and career 
Rynearson studies microbial ecology and evolutionary biology. She is particularly interested in diatoms - microscopically sized ocean plants, which help the ocean regulate global climate. She has studied the diversity of diatoms in the Narragansett Bay in Rhode Island. The Plankton of Narragansett Bay is one of the world's longest plankton studies, and has been collecting data every week since the 1950s. In particular, she created genetic analysis methods that allow her to see the circuitry inside cells.

In 2016, Rynearson was part of an expedition on the Nathaniel B. Palmer research vessel. The mission departed from Punta Arenas with a specific focus on diatoms in the Southern Ocean. The information she collected as combined with genetic information provided insight in how polar diatoms were impacted by environmental change.

Rynearson has been involved with the Metcalf Institute, which focuses on science communication. Rynearson was supported by the National Science Foundation ADVANCE program.

Selected publications

References 

Living people
Brown University alumni
University of Washington alumni
University of Rhode Island faculty
American women geneticists
Women climatologists
American climatologists
American geneticists
Year of birth missing (living people)